First mover may refer to:

Unmoved mover, a concept in Aristotle's philosophy
First-mover advantage in marketing
First-move advantage in chess

See also
Prime mover (disambiguation)